Buyūzan Takeyoshi (born July 29, 1974 as Takeyoshi Tominaga in Toyohashi, Aichi, Japan) is a former sumo wrestler. His highest rank was maegashira 1. He is now a sumo coach.

Career 
Tominaga began competitive sumo from a young age, losing to the future Kotomitsuki, two years his junior in a competition in 1989. A former amateur sumo champion at Meiji University, Buyūzan made his professional debut in the third makushita division in March 1997. It took him over three years to reach sekitori status, when he was promoted to the jūryō division in May 2000. He lost his first seven bouts in his jūryō debut and after finishing with a 6–9 record he was demoted back to makushita. He won the jūryō division championship or yūshō in July 2001, coming through an unprecedented eight man playoff and with a mere 9–6 score – the lowest ever yūshō–winning record for a 15 day tournament. After his makuuchi debut in November 2001, Buyūzan rose quickly rose in the ranks, winning special prizes for Fighting Spirit in two consecutive tournaments. He was listed as maegashira 1 when he suffered a right knee medial collateral ligament injury in March 2002 and dropped back to the lower maegashira ranks and even further into the jūryō division. After his return to makuuchi, he remained in the middle and lower maegashira ranks. In 2005, he dropped to jūryō again, but he returned to the top division in March 2006. By September he had returned to jūryō where he put up a disastrous 1-14 record. He was demoted to the non-salaried makushita division in November 2006 where he again turned in a losing score. In January 2007 he managed a 6-1 mark which put him in contention for a return to jūryō, but he faltered again with three straight makekoshi scores. He remained in the makushita division until his retirement after a loss on Day 13 of the 2007 Kyushu basho which gave him another makekoshi. His top division career record was 167 wins against 196 losses with 12 injury absences, a winning percentage of .460.

Retirement from sumo
Buyzūan has stayed in sumo as an elder of the Japan Sumo Association under the name Onaruto Oyakata, and works as a coach at Fujishima stable. His danpatsu-shiki, or official retirement ceremony, took place in October 2008. Upon Dejima's retirement in July 2009 he switched to the Sekinoto elder name. He became Yamawake Oyakata in September 2010 after the name was vacated by his former stablemate Wakanoyama. Among his duties in the Sumo Association is responsibility for the annual November tournament in Fukuoka.

Fighting style
Like many wrestlers, Buyūzan favoured straightforward pushing techniques, winning most of his bouts by oshidashi (push out).

Career record

See also 
Glossary of sumo terms
List of sumo tournament second division champions
List of past sumo wrestlers
List of sumo elders

References

External links 
 
Official profile
results for Buyuzan

1974 births
Living people
Japanese sumo wrestlers
People from Toyohashi
Sumo people from Aichi Prefecture